Murder in Kentucky constitutes the intentional killing, under circumstances defined by law, of people within or under the jurisdiction of the U.S. state of Kentucky.

The United States Centers for Disease Control and Prevention reported that in the year 2020, the state had a murder rate well above the median for the entire country.

Felony murder rule
In the state of Kentucky, the common law felony murder rule has been completely abolished.

KRS § 507.020
The Kentucky General Assembly abolished the felony murder rule with the enactment of Kentucky Revised Statutes § 507.020.  Recognizing that an automatic application of the rule could result in conviction of murder without a culpable mindset, the Kentucky Legislature instead allowed the circumstances of a case, like the commission of a felony, to be considered separately.  The facts each case would be used to show the mental state of the defendant instead of using an automatic rule.

Penalties

References

Murder in Kentucky
U.S. state criminal law
Kentucky law